Gdraymah (also as  or) is a town in the sub-governorate of Bariq in  the province of Asir, Saudi Arabia.

Climate 

Villages of Gdraymah 
Several villages form Gdraymah town:
 al-Makhada. It is the capital of Gdraymah Tribe of Bariq.
 Arkoub.
 Shab Shaqab. 
 Ghoraba
 al Menzl
 Mafraq.
 Shab Saguia .
 al Radm.
 al Kharba.
 al Isa.
 al Rabkh.
 el Waseel
 al Raha
 al Uyana.
 al Afos.
 Arranah .
 Shab Siyal.
 al Sai
 kancheela
 Tr'yba.

Influential people of Gdraymah
 Dr. Hamed al-Bariqi.
Ahmed Ibn Hayazah _Chief

See also 

 List of cities and towns in Saudi Arabia
 Regions of Saudi Arabia

References 

Populated places in 'Asir Province
Populated coastal places in Saudi Arabia
Populated places in Bareq